Sir Nigel Simon Rodley KBE (born Rosenfeld; 1 December 1941 – 25 January 2017) was an international lawyer and professor.

Personal life

Rodley was born in the West Riding of Yorkshire on 1 December 1941 to Hans Israel Rosenfeld and Rachel (née Kantorowitz). His parents later changed their name to Rodley. His father, who served in the British Army under the name John Peter Rodley, was killed in action in the Netherlands in September 1944. He was educated at Clifton College, where he was a member of Polack's, the Jewish boarding house. He was of Jewish descent.

As well as his native English, he spoke French, German, and Spanish.

Rodley married Lynette Bates in Leeds in 1967. He died aged 75 on 25 January 2017.

Professional positions
Rodley was:
 a member of the UN Human Rights Committee, a body of 18 human rights experts that monitors UN member states' compliance with the International Covenant on Civil and Political Rights(between 2001 and 2016), and
 a Commissioner of the International Commission of Jurists,
 a founding member and former Executive Committee Vice-Chairman of INTERIGHTS: International Centre for the Legal Protection of Human Rights.
 a member of the Executive Committee of the David Davies Memorial Institute of International Studies.
 a trustee of Freedom from Torture.
 a member of the International Independent Group of Eminent Persons, (IIGEP), a group of experts invited by the President of Sri Lanka Mahinda Rajapaksa to observe the workings of a Presidential Commission of Inquiry into serious Human Rights violations in Sri Lanka,
  a member of the Crimes Against Humanity Initiative Advisory Council, a project of the Whitney R. Harris World Law Institute at  Washington University School of Law in St. Louis to establish the world’s first treaty on the prevention and punishment of crimes against humanity.

Education
Rodley had degrees from:
 LLD – Dalhousie University, 2000 (honorary)
 PhD – University of Essex, 1992
 LLM – New York University, 1970
 LLM – Columbia University, 1965
 LLB – University of Leeds, 1963

Academic posts
Most recently, he was:
 Professor of Law and Chair of the Human Rights Centre, University of Essex, having taught there since 1990.

He had formerly taught at:
 Dalhousie University,
 the Graduate Faculty of the New School for Social Research (New York), and
 the London School of Economics.

Former positions
He was formerly:
 UN Special Rapporteur on torture, serving in this capacity from 1993 to 2001,
 working at UN Headquarters in New York City,
 for Amnesty International, Legal Advisor and Head of the Legal and Intergovernmental Organisations Office (1973–1990),

Publications
Published works include:
 (with Matt Pollard) The Treatment of Prisoners under International Law (3rd edition, 2009);
 (with Matt Pollard) "Criminalisation of Torture: State Obligations under the United Nations Convention against Torture and Other Cruel, Inhuman or Degrading Treatment or Punishment" 2006[2] European Human Rights Law Review 115 (2006);
 The UN Human Rights Machinery and International Criminal Law, in Lattimer and Sands (eds.), Justice for Crimes against Humanity (2003, Hart Publishing);
 "The Definition(s) of Torture in International Law" in Current Legal Problems. p467 (2002)
 The Treatment of Prisoners under International Law (1st edition 1987, 2nd edition 1999);
 Impunity of Human Rights (1998);
 (co-ed with Y Danieli and L Weisaeth)  International Responses to Traumatic Stress (1995);
 (ed)  To Loose the Bands of Wickedness – International Intervention in Defence of Human Rights  (1992);
 (with J I Domniguez, B Wood and R A Falk)  Enhancing Global Human Rights (1979);
 (co-ed with C N Ronning)  International Law in the Western Hemisphere  (1974);

In 2010, Routledge published The Delivery of Human Rights: Essays in Honour of Professor Sir Nigel Rodley, edited by his colleagues Geoff Gilbert, Francoise Hampson, and Clara Sandoval.

Lectures
 United Nations Treaty and Charter-based Human Rights Bodies: Competitive or Complementary? in the Lecture Series of the United Nations Audiovisual Library of International Law

Awards
 Recipient of the American Society of International Law's 2005 Goler T. Butcher Medal  for distinguished work in human rights.
 A KBE in recognition of his services to human rights and international law (1998).

References

External links

 University of Essex Human Rights Centre – Staff listing
 Department of Law listing
 ICJ listing
 UN HCHR listing
 Bahrain Authorities Failed in Implementing Report’s Recommendations – BICI member Prof. Rodley

1941 births
2017 deaths
Amnesty International people
United Nations Human Rights Committee members
United Nations Special Rapporteurs on torture
People educated at Clifton College
British Jews
British lawyers
British legal writers
British human rights activists
British legal scholars
Knights Commander of the Order of the British Empire
Alumni of the University of Essex
Academics of the University of Essex
British officials of the United Nations